Utinga is a genus of mydas flies in the family Mydidae. There is at least one described species in Utinga, U. francai.

References

Further reading

External links

 
 

Mydidae
Asiloidea genera